North Fork most commonly refers to the peninsula at the east end of the North Shore of Long Island.

North Fork may also refer to:

Communities
North Fork, Alberta, Canada

United States
North Fork, California, a town in Madera County
North Fork, California, the former name of Korbel, Humboldt County, California
North Fork, California, the former name of Seneca, California
North Fork Township, Stearns County, Minnesota
North Fork, Missouri, an unincorporated community
North Fork, Nevada, an unincorporated community in Elko County
Eden, Utah, also known as North Fork
Northfork, West Virginia

Tributaries
North Fork River (Missouri–Arkansas), a tributary of the White River
North Fork Double Mountain Fork Brazos River, a tributary of the Brazos River in Texas
North Fork Gunnison River, a tributary of the Gunnison River in Colorado
North Fork Creek, a tributary of Redbank Creek in Pennsylvania
North Fork Red River, a tributary of the Red River of the South
North Fork (Aarons Creek tributary), a stream in Halifax County, Virginia
North Fork Skykomish River, a tributary of the Snoqualmie River in Washington state
North Fork Popo Agie River, a tributary of the Wind River in Wyoming

Other
 Northfork, a 2003 film

See also

North Fork Dam (disambiguation)
North Fork River (disambiguation)
North Forks, New Brunswick, a community in Canada